Nursing Children and Young People is a nursing journal covering the practice of pediatric nursing. The journal was established in 1989 as Paediatric Nursing, obtaining its current title in 2014, and is published by RCN Publishing. It is abstracted and indexed in CINAHL, Embase, MEDLINE/PubMed, Scopus, ProQuest, EBSCO databases, and Thomson Gale.

See also
 List of nursing journals

External links
 

Pediatric nursing journals
English-language journals
Publications established in 1989
Royal College of Nursing publications